Jorge Hugo Giraldo López (born 5 September 1979) is a Colombian artistic gymnast and part of the national team.  He participated at the 2004 Summer Olympics, 2008 Summer Olympics and 2012 Summer Olympics.

References

1979 births
Living people
Colombian male artistic gymnasts
Gymnasts at the 2012 Summer Olympics
Olympic gymnasts of Colombia
Place of birth missing (living people)
Gymnasts at the 2004 Summer Olympics
Gymnasts at the 2008 Summer Olympics
Gymnasts at the 1999 Pan American Games
Gymnasts at the 2003 Pan American Games
Gymnasts at the 2007 Pan American Games
Gymnasts at the 2011 Pan American Games
Gymnasts at the 2015 Pan American Games
Pan American Games silver medalists for Colombia
Pan American Games bronze medalists for Colombia
Pan American Games medalists in gymnastics
Central American and Caribbean Games gold medalists for Colombia
Central American and Caribbean Games silver medalists for Colombia
Central American and Caribbean Games bronze medalists for Colombia
South American Games gold medalists for Colombia
South American Games silver medalists for Colombia
South American Games bronze medalists for Colombia
South American Games medalists in gymnastics
Competitors at the 1998 South American Games
Competitors at the 2006 South American Games
Competitors at the 2010 South American Games
Competitors at the 2014 South American Games
Competitors at the 2006 Central American and Caribbean Games
Competitors at the 2010 Central American and Caribbean Games
Competitors at the 2014 Central American and Caribbean Games
Central American and Caribbean Games medalists in gymnastics
Medalists at the 2011 Pan American Games
Medalists at the 2015 Pan American Games
20th-century Colombian people
21st-century Colombian people